Alana Ramsay (born December 22, 1994) is a Canadian paralympic alpine skier, born in Calgary, Alberta. Ramsay, who was born with cerebral palsy due to a stroke at birth, started skiing at age 6. On the Para-Alpine World Cup circuit in 2015/16, she landed her first podium. In both 2016 and 2017, Ramsay was named Canadian Ski Racing Female Para Alpine Athlete of the Year. Ramsay has competed in 3 Paralympic games thus far, she won bronze medals at the Pyeongchang 2018 Winter Paralympics in both the Super G and Super Combined events. In the 2022 Beijing Winter Paralympics, Ramsay won two more bronze medals, in the Super Combined Standing and Super-G Standing events.

References

External links 
 Alana Ramsay at Pyeongchang 2018 Paralympic Winter Games 
 
 Alana Ramsay at Alpine Canada
 

1994 births
Living people
Canadian female alpine skiers
Paralympic alpine skiers of Canada
Paralympic bronze medalists for Canada
Alpine skiers at the 2014 Winter Paralympics
Alpine skiers at the 2018 Winter Paralympics
Alpine skiers at the 2022 Winter Paralympics
Medalists at the 2018 Winter Paralympics
Medalists at the 2022 Winter Paralympics
Paralympic medalists in alpine skiing
20th-century Canadian women
21st-century Canadian women